The 2006 Kazakhstan Hockey Cup was the fifth edition of the Kazakhstan Hockey Cup, the national ice hockey cup competition in Kazakhstan. Six teams participated and Kazakhmys Satpaev won its 2nd cup.

Results

References

2006–07 in Kazakhstani ice hockey
Kazakhstan Hockey Cup